Gyo-dong is a dong or neighborhood in the city of Gangneung, Gangwon province, South Korea.

Highlights

Transportation
Gangneung Station

Sports
Gangneung Olympic Park
Gangneung Stadium

References

Neighbourhoods in South Korea
Geography of Gangwon Province, South Korea